This City Is a Battlefield is an upcoming Indonesian war drama film written and directed by Mouly Surya. The film is adaptation of Jalan Tak Ada Ujung by Mochtar Lubis and is set in 1946, a year after Indonesia's independence from Dutch and Japanese occupation.

Synopsis 
Set in Jakarta in 1946, Isa, a 35-year-old former fighter and a violinist, is now an elementary school teacher. His service during the war for independence leaves him with a reputation as a seasoned soldier. His trauma, however, leaves him with impotence.

Cast 
 Lukman Sardi as Isa
 Ariel Tatum as Fatimah
 Jerome Kurnia as Hazil

Production 
The film marks Mouly Surya's first project that is based on an existing material. To fund the project, Surya sought funding from several sources, such as the Hubert Bals Fund, who also funded her sophomore release What They Don't Talk About When They Talk About Love in 2013. Additionally, Bangkok-based Purin Pictures also announced in 2020 that they selected the project to receive a US$30,000 production grant.

Release 
The film began production in late 2019 and was set for a 2020 release. However, it was pushed back due to the COVID-19 pandemic. In March 2021, Surya stated on Twitter that the film is likely to be pushed back due to the COVID-19 situation.

References

External links

Indonesian drama films
Indonesian war films
Films based on Indonesian novels
Upcoming films